Dennis Hillebrand (born 30 November 1979 in Leonberg) is a German former professional footballer who played as a defender.

References

External links
 

1979 births
Living people
People from Leonberg
Sportspeople from Stuttgart (region)
German footballers
Association football defenders
German football managers
VfR Aalen players
SpVgg Greuther Fürth players
Rot Weiss Ahlen players
FSV Frankfurt players
2. Bundesliga players
3. Liga players
Footballers from Baden-Württemberg